The Lord Howe Seamount Chain of which Gifford Guyot  is an eruptive centre, and part of a pair of coral-capped guyots, formed during the Miocene. The Gifford Marine Park is co-located off the Queensland coast near Brisbane.
[
 {
 "type": "FeatureCollection",
 "features": [
 { "type": "Feature", "properties": { "stroke-width":1, "stroke": "#ff0000","stroke-opacity":0.5,"fill-opacity":0.5, "fill": "#ff0000",  "title": "Nova Bank" }, "geometry": { "type": "Polygon", "coordinates": [ [ [ 159.0, -22.38333], [ 159.4, -22.38333 ], [ 159.4, -21.98333 ], [ 159.0, -21.98333 ], [ 159.0, -22.38333 ] ] ] } },
{ "type": "Feature", "properties": { "stroke-width":1, "stroke": "#ff0000","stroke-opacity":0.5,"fill-opacity":0.5, "fill": "#ff0000", "title": "Flinders Seamount" }, "geometry": { "type": "Polygon", "coordinates": [ [ [ 159.59376, -34.39096], [ 159.19376, -34.39096 ], [ 159.19376, -33.99096 ], [ 159.59376, -33.99096 ], [ 159.59376, -34.39096 ] ] ] } },
{ "type": "Feature", "properties": { "stroke-width":1, "stroke": "#ff0000","stroke-opacity":0.5,"fill-opacity":0.5, "fill": "#ffffff", "title": "Lord Howe Island" }, "geometry": { "type": "Polygon", "coordinates": [ [ [ 158.88500, -31.75417], [ 159.28500, -31.75417 ], [ 159.28500, -31.35417 ], [ 158.88500, -31.35417], [ 158.88500, -31.75417 ] ] ] } },
{ "type": "Feature", "properties": { "stroke-width":1, "stroke": "#ff0000","stroke-opacity":0.5,"fill-opacity":0.5, "fill": "#ff0000", "title": "Argo Bank" }, "geometry": { "type": "Polygon", "coordinates": [ [ [ 159.3, -23.05], [ 159.7, -23.05 ], [ 159.7, -23.45 ], [ 159.3, -23.45 ], [ 159.3, -23.05 ] ] ] } },
{ "type": "Feature", "properties": { "stroke-width":1, "stroke": "#ff0000","stroke-opacity":0.5,"fill-opacity":0.5, "fill": "#ff0000", "title": "Kelso Bank" }, "geometry": { "type": "Polygon", "coordinates": [ [ [ 159.3, -23.96667], [ 159.7, -23.96667 ], [  159.7, -24.36667 ], [ 159.3, -24.36667 ], [ 159.3, -23.96667 ] ] ] } },
{ "type": "Feature", "properties": { "stroke-width":1, "stroke": "#ff0000","stroke-opacity":0.5,"fill-opacity":0.5, "fill": "#ff0000", "title": "Capel Bank" }, "geometry": { "type": "Polygon", "coordinates": [ [ [ 159.38333, -24.8], [ 159.78333, -24.8 ], [  159.78333, -25.2 ], [ 159.38333, -25.2 ], [ 159.38333, -24.8 ] ] ] } },
{ "type": "Feature", "properties": { "stroke-width":1, "stroke": "#ff0000", "stroke-opacity":1.0,"fill-opacity":1.0,"fill": "#ff0000", "title": "Gifford Guyot" }, "geometry": { "type": "Polygon", "coordinates": [ [ [ 159.21667, -26.46667], [ 159.61667, -26.46667 ], [  159.61667, -26.86667 ], [ 159.21667, -26.86667 ], [ 159.21667, -26.46667 ] ] ] } }, 
{ "type": "Feature", "properties": { "stroke-width":1, "stroke": "#ff0000","stroke-opacity":0.5,"fill-opacity":0.5, "fill": "#ffffff", "title": "Middleton Reef" }, "geometry": { "type": "Polygon", "coordinates": [ [ [ 158.91667, -29.25], [ 159.31667, -29.25 ], [  159.31667, -29.65 ], [ 158.91667, -29.65 ], [ 158.91667, -29.25 ] ] ] } },
{ "type": "Feature", "properties": { "stroke-width":1, "stroke": "#ff0000","stroke-opacity":0.5,"fill-opacity":0.5, "fill": "#ffffff", "title": "Elizabeth Reef" }, "geometry": { "type": "Polygon", "coordinates": [ [ [ 158.88333, -29.76667], [ 159.28333, -29.76667 ], [  159.28333, -29.36667 ], [ 158.88333, -29.36667 ], [ 158.88333, -29.76667 ] ] ] } }, 
{ "type": "Feature", "properties": { "stroke-width":1, "stroke": "#ff0000","stroke-opacity":0.5,"fill-opacity":0.5, "fill": "#ff0000", "title": "Heemskerck Seamount" }, "geometry": { "type": "Polygon", "coordinates": [ [ [ 159.30809, -36.07751], [ 158.90809, -36.07751 ], [  158.90809, -36.47751 ], [ 159.30809, -36.47751 ], [ 159.30809, -36.07751 ] ] ] } },
{ "type": "Feature", "properties": { "stroke-width":1, "stroke": "#ff0000","stroke-opacity":0.5,"fill-opacity":0.5, "fill": "#ff0000", "title": "Zeehaen Seamount" }, "geometry": { "type": "Polygon", "coordinates": [ [ [ 159.72079, -36.13855], [ 159.32079, -36.13855], [  159.32079, -36.53855 ], [ 159.72079, -36.53855 ], [ 159.72079, -36.13855 ] ] ] } },
{ "type": "Feature", "properties": { "stroke-width":1, "stroke": "#ff0000","stroke-opacity":0.5,"fill-opacity":0.5, "fill": "#ffffff", "title": "Ball's Pyramid" }, "geometry": { "type": "Polygon", "coordinates": [ [ [ 159.05167, -31.55417], [ 159.45167, -31.55417 ], [  159.45167, -31.15417 ], [ 159.05167, -31.15417 ], [ 159.05167, -31.55417 ] ] ] } }
]}
]

Geology
The Gifford guyots are two flat‐topped basaltic seamounts, now caped with carbonate sediments with the larger  Gifford Guyot dated at 15.6 million years ago but the smaller unnamed seamount of unknown age.

See also

 Gifford Marine Park

References 

Guyots
Hotspot tracks
Volcanoes of Zealandia
Seamounts of the Pacific Ocean
Seamounts of the Tasman Sea